Yuk may refer to:
Mr. Yuk, a trademarked cartoon graphic image, widely employed in the United States in labeling of substances that are poisonous if ingested
Yuk, a sophomore at the United States Military Academy
Yuk Yuk's, a national comedy club chain in Canada, owned and established by former stand-up comedian Mark Breslin
 Yuk, a Korean surname derived from Lu (surname 陆)
Yuk Young-soo, former first lady of South Korea
The Ainu word for the Yezo sika deer.

See also
 Yuck (disambiguation)